Cantao ocellatus is a species of shield bug in the family Scutelleridae found across Asia. Reddish or ochre in overall colour it has dark legs and bluish black antennae. A dark bluish black stripe is present along the central line of the head. The pronotum sometimes has two black spots on the front margin and sometimes has eight spots. The scutellum has eight or six black spots of variable size but with yellowish borders. The lateral angle of the pronotum is elongated into a curved spine but this can be much reduced. A distinctive symbiotic bacterial genus Sodalis from phylum Gammaproteobacteria is found in its midgut. Maternal care of eggs and nymphs has been noted in this species. The female covers the eggs after they are laid but eggs on the edge that she cannot cover are often parasitized by wasps.

They suck sap from a wide range of plants including Macaranga, Kigelia, Mallotus, Bischofia javanica and Broussonetia papyrifera.

References

Scutelleridae
Insects described in 1784
Hemiptera of Asia